Katie Wilkinson (born 5 November 1994) is a forward for FA Women's Championship club, Southampton.

Club career

Birmingham City Women 
Wilkinson made her senior debut in 2013 in the Women's Super League (WSL) for Birmingham City Women. The forward came on from the bench in a 1-1 draw against Notts County Ladies. During the remainder of the 2013 WSL Season, Wilkinson made nine more appearances, three of which were starts. Her first senior goal, and only goal of the season came against Doncaster Rovers Belles. She scored the opening goal in a 3-0 victory away from home.

During the 2014 WSL Season, Wilkinson only made one league appearance, which came against Everton in a 0-0 draw at home. In the Women's Super Cup, Wilkinson made two appearances. One against Yeovil United, where Wilkinson scored the opening goal in a 2-1 win, and one against Aston Villa Women.

Aston Villa Women 
During the 2014 campaign, Wilkinson joined Aston Villa women on loan until the end of the season. Wilkinson quickly established herself amongst her teammates, and scored the winning brace against Oxford Women in a 2-1 victory. Aston Villa finished fourth during the 2014 WSL 2 campaign, and Wilkinson's performances meant her time at Aston Villa was extended.

In the summer of 2016, Wilkinson suffered a major injury to her right ankle, where she broke five ligaments. The injury kept her out for the remainder of the season.

Wilkinson made a return for the 2017/18 season, and made five appearances, four coming from the bench. Wilkinson failed to score in any of these appearances.

London Bees 
In January 2018, Wilkinson signed for London Bees. In the remainder of the 2017/18 season, Wilkinson made 12 appearances and scored eight goals. Wilkinson's first appearance for her new club came against her former club, Aston Villa, in a 3-3 draw.  Wilkinson came on from the bench and clinched the equalising goal in the 90th minute of the game, earning a point for her new side. Wilkinson also scored a brace against Watford Ladies, in a 4-0 win away from home. The impact Wilkinson made was recognised as she won the May 2018 WSL 2 Player of the Month. London Bees finished the 2017/18 season in sixth place, three places against Wilkinson's former club, Aston Villa, who ended the season in ninth.

In Wilkinson's first full season for London Bees, she made 13 appearances, however only managed to score twice. Her two goals throughout the season came against Leicester City Women, and Crystal Palace Women, both were in 2-1 wins for London Bees.

Sheffield United Women 
Wilkinson's performances earned herself a move to Sheffield United, where she was announced as vice captain for the South Yorkshire club. Wilkinson made her Sheffield United debut against Aston Villa, and also opened her account in a 3-2 loss away from home. Wilkinson remained in fine goal scoring form throughout the season, and registered braces against Leicester, and both fixtures against Coventry City Ladies. In the reverse fixture against Leicester, Wilkinson scored a hat-trick in a victory away from home. Wilkinson's ended for the 2018/19 season was 15 goals in 14 appearances. The season's cancellation meant Sheffield missed out on promotion to the WSL to Aston Villa, who finished six points clear.

Wilkinson's performances earned her the FA Women's Championship Player of the Season, as well as the FA Women's Championship Golden Boot.

In the following season, Wilkinson has picked up where she has left off scoring 16 goals in 17 appearances, and is currently the leagues top goal scorer. She has also earned the February 2021 Fa Women's Championship Player of the Month award.

References

External links

Women's Championship (England) players
Sheffield United W.F.C. players
1994 births
Living people
English women's footballers
Birmingham City W.F.C. players
Aston Villa W.F.C. players
London Bees players
Coventry United W.F.C. players
Women's Super League players
Women's association football forwards
Southampton F.C. Women players